West Bloomfield can refer to several places in the United States:

 West Bloomfield Township, Michigan
 West Bloomfield, New York
 West Bloomfield, Wisconsin